Kalasuri Palamakumbura Herath Mudiyanselage Sriyani Weerakoon Kumarihami (born 14 June 1944 as ශ්‍රියානි අමරසේන), popularly as Sriyani Amarasena, is an actress in Sri Lankan cinema and television as well as a producer. Sriyani has appeared in several critically acclaimed Lester James Peries' movies including Golu Hadawatha, Desa Nisa and Ahasin Polawata.

Personal life
She was born on 14 June 1944 in Meethotamulla, Kolonnawa, Sri Lanka. Her father worked at Colombo Municipal Council. She had her education from three schools, primary education from Meetotamulla College, and then from Musaeus College and Gothami Balika Vidyalaya, Colombo.

She is married to former journalist Arthur U. Amarasena. The couple has one daughter, Inoka Amarasena and one son, Sampath Amarasena. Inoka also acted in few films such as Kristhu Charithaya and Gehenu Lamai.

Acting career
During school time, she acted few dramas like Hathara Beeri Kathawa and Koheda Yanne Rukmani. Then, she met Siri Perera and entered to Lama Mandapaya program in the SLBC. Amarasena first appeared on stage drama with P. D.L Perera's Thammanna, and then gain popularity with the role daughter of Dayananda Gunawardena's stage drama Naribana. Some of her other stage dramas include Hitha Honda Ammandi and Ves Muhunu.

Her maiden cinematic appearance came through a feature film Wings Over Ceylon directed by Pagngnasoma Hettiarachchi. Then she acted in a minifilm Keti Kathawa directed by D.B. Nihalsinghe. This film is recorded as the first cinemascope film produced in Sri Lanka.

After the marriage, Amarasena entered mainstream cinema, where her maiden acting came through in the blockbuster film Golu Hadawatha in 1968. This in turn opened door to enter popular cinema industry. Some of her notable dramatic roles came through the film such as Desa Nisa, Ahasin Polawata, Viragaya and Mahagedara. Apart from dramatic roles, Amarasena also acted many commercial films of many genre, such as Kalyani Ganga and Raththaran Amma, which earned her positive critical responses. In 1993, she was awarded the Sarasaviya award for the film Kulageya.

Her maiden teledrama production came through Dath Kekulu Pala. Then she produced three television serials, Ira Bata Taruwa, Hemanthaye Wasanthayak  and Hangi Muttham where they made partly in London for England-based Sri Lankan audiences. In 2003, she directed and produced the tele series Peraliya, which was shot in Australia. In 2005, she directed the serial Thusharaye Chaya which was shot in USA. In 2011, she directed the serial Mayura Asapuwa.

In 2019, he was honored with Janabhimani Honorary Award at the Bandaranaike Memorial International Conference Hall. In 2021, he was honored with the 'Deshabhimani Keerthi Kalabushana' award.

Filmography

As actress

As producer

References

External links
  Face 2 Face with Sriyani Amarasena
  Journalist cum actress

මම කිසිදේකින් සැලෙන්නේ නෑ - ප්‍රවීණ රංගවේදිනී ශි‍්‍රයාණි අමරසේන

Living people
Sri Lankan film actresses
1944 births
Alumni of Musaeus College